Psychopathic Murder Mix Volume 1 is a remix album by Mike E. Clark. Released on June 23, 2009, it features mashups and remixes of songs by Insane Clown Posse, Twiztid, Boondox, Prozak, King Gordy and Blaze Ya Dead Homie. It also features appearances by Awesome Dre, The R.O.C. and Esham.

Music
Psychopathic Murder Mix Volume 1 was created, recorded, performed, produced, and mixed in the Funhouse Studio by Mike E. Clark. The album is made up of seven remixes and three mashups, all but one from which the original versions were produced by Mike E. Clark, as well as five original tracks.

Allrovi said that "The kinetic productions combine the influence of old-school electro with the funk flavor of Clark's former employer George Clinton [and] a bit of Danny Elfman's sense of humor in the Oingo Boingo-like mad-clown melodies."

Reception

Allrovi wrote, "Anyone who thinks Clark is the label's driving force will appreciate all this evidence, while fan club members will get some deconstructions to relish."

Track listing

Samples
Rock The Dead Body Man
 "Wagon Wagon" by Insane Clown Posse from Ringmaster
Out Here (Remix)
 "The Killing Fields" by Insane Clown Posse from Riddle Box
Ill Connect (Remix)
 Instrumental from "Wicked Hellaween" by Insane Clown Posse from Forgotten Freshness Volume 4
How Long Will You Juggalos Be Down?
 Instrumental from "Get Off Me Dog" by Insane Clown Posse from Ringmaster
 "Down With the Clown" by Insane Clown Posse from The Great Milenko
Southwest Mash-Up
 "Mr. Johnson's Head" by Insane Clown Posse from Ringmaster
Outro
 "Amy's in the Attic" by Insane Clown Posse from The Terror Wheel
 "Cemetery Girl" by Insane Clown Posse from Riddle Box

References

Albums produced by Mike E. Clark
2009 remix albums
Psychopathic Records remix albums